= Seattle University of Washington =

Seattle University of Washington may refer to:

- Seattle University, in Seattle, Washington
- University of Washington, in Seattle, Washington
